Aldo Brizzi is an Italian composer and conductor.

Biography 
He was born in Alessandria, Italy, in 1960. Studies at the Milan Conservatory, conducting workshops with Leonard Bernstein, Pierre Boulez, and Sergiu Celibidache. Master's degree from the DAMS Bologna. He has also worked with Giacinto Scelsi who has influenced his artistic direction.

He has composed music for solo, ensembles and orchestras, including the Strings of the Berlin Philharmonic, European Union Youth Orchestra, the Danish National Symphony Orchestra, the Orchestre philharmonique de Radio France, Arditti String Quartet. His awards include the Venezia Opera Prima del Teatro La Fenice (1981), European Year of Music (Biennale di Venezia, Festival d'Automne in Paris, WDR di Cologne/Köln, 1985), Concorso nazionale Franco Evangelisti in Rome/Roma (1986), and the Young Composers' Forum in Cologne/Köln (1989).

As conductor, he was director of the Ensembles of Ferienkurse in Darmstadt from 1990 to 1994 and is now music director of Núcleo de Ópera da Bahia, Brazil. He has also conducted the Orchestre Philharmonique de Radio France in Paris, Kammermusik Philharmonishes Berlin, etc. and recorded albums with Bamberger Symphoniker, Filarmonica di Torino, Orquestra Metropolitana de Lisboa.

In the late 1990s and throughout the 2000s, Aldo Brizzi has moved into a more experimental direction by fusing different musical traditions and styles. This culminated in the widely acclaimed album Brizzi do Brasil(featuring Caetano Veloso, Gilberto Gil, Teresa Salgueiro among others), which won the Trofeu Caymmi in Brazil, "best Brazilian album production 2003".

Aldo Brizzi has written operas such as “Mambo Mistico” (libretto by Alfredo Arias) produced by Theatre National de Chaillot – Paris, “Gabriel et Gabriel” performed in many theaters in France, “Ópera dos Terreiros” performed in Grenoble, Rome, Belém and Salvador, “Jelin”, a comic opera set on the background of the events of the year zero, premiered in Alessandria, Italy in 2021 and a new orchestration of “Treemonisha” by Scott Joplin. A new opera, Amor Azul, written with Gilberto Gil, was programmed in Paris in 2020 and is now rescheduled for 2022.

Discography 
 The Labyrinth Trial (1999), featuring Maurizio Barbetti, Brake drum percussion, Francesco Cuoghi, Massimo Agostinelli, Ensemble Orphée; Rara-Kho, Italy 
 Brizzi do Brasil (2002), featuring Ala dos Namorados, Arnaldo Antunes, Augusto de Campos, Carlinhos Brown, Caetano Veloso, Gilberto Gil, Margareth Menezes, Olodum, Teresa Salgueiro, Tom Zé, Virgínia Rodrigues and Zeca Baleiro; Eldorado Sony, Brazil
 Aço do Açúcar (2005), Graça Reis, vocals and Aço do Açúcar; ACOACO4001, Brazil
 Obrigado (2006) by Teresa Salgueiro featuring Aldo Brizzi; EMI 
 Reis (2008) EP, Graça Reis, vocals / Aldo Brizzi, electronics; WorldMediaVision, Mexico
 Vela (2016) for saxophones and 3 ensembles, soloist Daniel Kientzy: Nova Musica, France 
 Holos (2021) Raghunath Manet) 2021; Magic & Unique Group / Musica Presente, Los Angeles/Italy
 Oratório de Santo Antônio (2022), for soprano, mezzo, tenor, bass, chorus and 4 instruments. Núcleo de Ópera da Bahia; Musica Mundi, Brazil

References

Bibliography

Aldo Brizzi writings 
 "Nostro", in Proposte musicali, Edizioni del Centro Musicale Fiorentino, Firenze (1980)
 "Musica e ideologia", in Aldo Brizzi - Renzo Cresti, La musica, le idee, le cose, Edizioni del Centro Musicale Fiorentino, Firenze (1981)
 "My visits to Via San Teodoro", in I suoni, le onde... n. 2, Fondazione Isabella Scelsi, Roma (1991)
 "Giacinto Scelsi", in Pierre Albert Castanet - Nicola Cisternino, Viaggio al centro del suono, Luna Editore, La Spezia (1992)
 "Wahrnehmung von Sinn und Zeichen im Lied" in Heinrich Heine von Dichtung un Musik, Hugo-Wolf Akademie, Tutzing (1996) ISBN 3 7952 0834 3
 "Scelsi", in Von Krachnistein zu Gegenwart, Daco Verlag, Stoccarda (1996) ISBN 3-87135-028-1
 "L'intimità rituale del gesto esecutivo", in I suoni, le onde... n. 21, Fondazione Isabella Scelsi, Roma (2008)
 "Il progetto musicale" in Valerio Berruti, Dove il cielo s'attacca alla collina, Silvana Editoriale, Milano (2013)

Writings about Aldo Brizzi 
 Renzo Cresti, "Aldo Brizzi, avvelenamento del linguaggio", in Rivista Pasquino musicale n. 7, Latina 1992
Augusto de Campos, "Nóva Música: Brizzi do Brasil" in Música de Inveção 2, Editora Perspectiva, São Paolo (Brazil) (2016) ISBN 9788527310505
Augusto de Campos, "Aldo Brizzi, na Bahia" in A prova do labirinto, in the concert program of Teatro Rivoli, Oporto (April 2000)
Flora Süssekind, "Nota sobre "ão" in Sobre Augusto de Campos, pp. 140–160, Viveiros de Castro Editora, Rio de Janeiro (2004) I>SBN 85-7577-134-5
Renzo Cresti, "Avvelenamenti, labirinti, musiche del mondo" in Sito dedicato alla musica contemporanea, Lucca 2012
Jorge Alfredo Guimarães, "A porta do labirinto" in Caderno de Cinema, (23-2-2013), Brazil
Renzo Cresti, "Una girandola di presenti" in Musica presente, LIM, Lucca (2019) ISBN 978-88-5543-001-2
Valerio Sebastiani, "Musica libera e realismo magico" in Quinte parallele, rivista digitale, Roma, November 26, 2019
Antonella Vicini, "Let the music speak" in The Badger n. 6, pagg. 116–123, 2020

External links
Official composer website
Official conductor website
YouTube composer channel

Living people
Italian composers
Italian male composers
1960 births